The Rajinhang Line, or Rajin Port Line, is an electrified  long railway line of the Korean State Railway in North Korea, connecting Rajin at the junction of the P'yŏngra and Hambuk lines with Rajin Port.

History
The line was opened in 1935 by the South Manchuria Railway as the Najinbudu Line ("Najin Wharf Line", 나진부두선, Najinbudu-sŏn; 羅津埠頭, Rashinfutō-sen). After the end of the Pacific War in 1945 and the subsequent establishment of the DPRK, it was nationalised with all other railways and taken over by the Korean State Railway, and given its current name.

Route 

A yellow background in the "Distance" box indicates that section of the line is not electrified.

References

Railway lines in North Korea
Standard gauge railways in North Korea
Mantetsu railway lines